E Train may refer to:

 E (New York City Subway service)
 Electron transport chain
 Green Line E branch, a streetcar line in Boston, Massachusetts
E Line (Los Angeles Metro), a light rail line in Los Angeles County, California

See also
 E-line (disambiguation)